Ignacio Orbaiceta Zabalza (4 April 1923 – 20 April 2011) was a Spanish racing cyclist. Professional from 1941 to 1949, Orbaiceta had 34 victories, including a stage win of the 1946 Vuelta a España.

Major results

1941
 2nd Circuito de Getxo
1942
 1st GP Pascuas
1943
 3rd National Cyclo-cross Championships
 3rd GP Pascuas
1944
 1st GP Pascuas
 1st Stage 5 Vuelta a la Comunidad Valenciana
 1st Stage 2 Volta a Catalunya
 1st Stages 4, 6 & 8 Gran Premio Victoria Manresa
1945
 1st GP Pascuas
 2nd National Cyclo-cross Championships
 2nd Trofeo del Sprint
1946
 1st Stage 3 Vuelta a España
 1st Trofeo del Sprint
 1st Stages 1 & 6 Volta a Catalunya
 2nd Circuito de Getxo
1949
 1st Trofeo del Sprint

References

External links
 

1923 births
2011 deaths
Spanish male cyclists
Spanish Vuelta a España stage winners
People from Cuenca de Pamplona
Cyclists from Navarre